The 2022 Hamburg Ladies & Gents Cup was a professional tennis tournament played on indoor hard courts. It was the third edition of the tournament which was part of the 2022 ATP Challenger Tour and the 2022 ITF Women's World Tennis Tour. It took place in Hamburg, Germany between 17 and 23 October 2022.

Champions

Men's singles

  Alexander Ritschard def.  Henri Laaksonen 7–5, 6–5 ret.

Women's singles

  Rebeka Masarova def.  Ysaline Bonaventure, 6–4, 6–3

Men's doubles

  Treat Huey /  Max Schnur def.  Dustin Brown /  Julian Lenz 7–6(8–6), 6–4.

Women's doubles

  Miriam Kolodziejová /  Jesika Malečková def.  Veronika Erjavec /  Malene Helgø, 6–4, 6–2

Men's singles main draw entrants

Seeds

 1 Rankings are as of 10 October 2022.

Other entrants
The following players received wildcards into the singles main draw:
  Nicola Kuhn
  Rudolf Molleker
  Marko Topo

The following player received entry into the singles main draw as a special exempt:
  Max Hans Rehberg

The following player received entry into the singles main draw as an alternate:
  Raphaël Collignon

The following players received entry from the qualifying draw:
  Evgeny Donskoy
  Jeremy Jahn
  Ergi Kırkın
  Julian Lenz
  Matteo Martineau
  Andrew Paulson

Women's singles main draw entrants

Seeds

 1 Rankings are as of 10 October 2022.

Other entrants
The following players received wildcards into the singles main draw:
  Mara Guth
  Carolina Kuhl
  Ella Seidel
  Joëlle Steur

The following players received entry from the qualifying draw:
  Malene Helgø
  Julia Middendorf
  Tayisiya Morderger
  Yana Morderger
  Tereza Smitková
  Julia Stusek
  Arina Vasilescu
  Ekaterina Yashina

The following players received entry as lucky losers:
  Selina Dal
  Anna Klasen

References

External links
 2022 Hamburg Ladies & Gents Cup at ITFtennis.com
 Official website

2022 ATP Challenger Tour
2022 ITF Women's World Tennis Tour
2022 in German tennis
October 2022 sports events in Germany